Tweety's Circus is a 1955 Warner Bros. Merrie Melodies cartoon short directed by Friz Freleng. The short was released on June 4, 1955, and stars Tweety and Sylvester.

Plot
The story centers on Sylvester visiting a circus, where he not only tries to catch Tweety for his meal, but attempts to one-up a lion (an attraction billed as "King of the Cats").

A carefree Sylvester walks into the circus singing his theme "Meow!" where he visits the various animal exhibits. There, upon seeing the lion exhibit, the unimpressed cat immediately expresses his displeasure over the large feline's billing.  All that changes when he realizes he'd just passed by the Tweety Bird... and thus the chase begins.

Tweety runs into the big top, where the lion, now uncaged, is waiting to maul Sylvester for his earlier remarks (not to mention Sylvester clobbering him with a shovel). From this point forward, the lion serves as both an antagonist for Sylvester and a protector of Tweety.

Sylvester tries beating what he thinks is a fire hose to free Tweety, unknowing that the "hose" is an elephant's trunk. The elephant grabs Sylvester with his trunk and—after crushing his chest—throws the battered puss into the lion's cage, where the lion finishes the job.

Other run-ins with the lion, elephant and other animals, all ending with Sylvester getting the worst of things, involve him exploiting his abilities as a high diver (Tweety directs the elephant to "drink it all down" (referring to the water before Sylvester lands), a fire eater (the lion makes Sylvester eat the fire) and a high-wire walker ("hewwooooo, puddy tat!").

In the end, Sylvester finally gets rid of the lion ... only to unwittingly lock himself in a cage with even more lions (also the antagonists for Sylvester) and tigers. Tweety immediately takes a hat and cane and becomes a carnival barker ("Huwwy! Huwwy! Huwwy! Step wight up for da gweatest show on Eawth! Fifty wions and one puddy tat!") A loud roar erupts, and with Sylvester presumably having met his fate, Tweety changes his spiel: "Step wight up! Fifty wions, count 'em, fifty wions!"

See also
List of American films of 1955

References

External links

 
 

1955 films
1955 short films
1955 animated films
1955 comedy-drama films
1950s American animated films
1950s children's comedy films
1950s children's drama films
1950s children's animated films
1950s English-language films
1950s Warner Bros. animated short films
American children's animated comedy films
American children's animated drama films
American animated short films
American comedy-drama films
Children's comedy-drama films
Merrie Melodies short films
Sylvester the Cat films
Tweety films
Fictional rivalries
Films about camels
Animated films about elephants
Animated films about lions
Animated films about tigers
Talking animals in fiction
Animated films set in the United States
Circus films
Films set in 1955
Short films directed by Friz Freleng
Films scored by Milt Franklyn
Warner Bros. Cartoons animated short films
Comedy-drama short films